Lorenze Verdecía Maturell (born 1960) is a team handball coach from Cuba. He coaches the Cuba women's national handball team, and participated at the 2011 World Women's Handball Championship in Brazil.

References

1960 births
Living people
Cuban handball coaches